James Winstone (9 February 1863 – 27 July 1921) was a British trade unionist

Born in Risca, Winstone worked from the age of eight, first at a local brickworks, then at Risca United Colliery.  He was elected checkweighman, and worked with William Brace to campaign against the sliding pay scale.  As a result, he was a prominent founder member of the South Wales Miners' Federation (SWMF) in 1898.

Winstone was also active in the Independent Labour Party, and was a Baptist lay preacher.  He was elected for the Labour Party to Risca Urban District Council, then to Abersychan council, which he chaired in 1911.  In 1907, he was elected to Monmouthshire County Council.  He stood at Monmouth Boroughs at the 1906 general election, but received no backing from his union, and was not elected.  In 1912, he was elected as Vice President of the SWMF, the first socialist to such a position.  He was selected as the Labour candidate for the 1915 Merthyr Tydfil by-election, the seat having previously been held by Keir Hardie, but he was defeated by Charles Butt Stanton of the British Workers League, who had resigned as a miners' agent to run with Conservative and Liberal support as a pro-war independent labour candidate.  In 1915, he replaced Brace as union president, serving until his death.  He also stood in Merthyr at the 1918 general election, but was again unsuccessful.  In 1920, he chaired Monmouthshire County Council.

References

1863 births
1921 deaths
Councillors in Wales
Independent Labour Party National Administrative Committee members
Labour Party (UK) parliamentary candidates
British trade union leaders
People from Risca